In baseball, a wild pitch (abbreviated WP) is charged against a pitcher when his pitch is too high, too short, or too wide of home plate for the catcher to control with ordinary effort, thereby allowing a baserunner, perhaps even the batter-runner on an uncaught third strike, to advance. A wild pitch usually passes the catcher behind home plate, often allowing runners on base an easy chance to advance while the catcher chases the ball down. Sometimes the catcher may block a pitch, and the ball may be nearby, but the catcher has trouble finding the ball, allowing runners to advance.

Tony Mullane is the all-time leader in wild pitches with 343 career. Mullane is also the only player to throw more than 300 career wild pitches.

Key

List

References

Baseball-Reference.com

Major League Baseball statistics
Wild pitches leaders